Eugene McDuff (September 17, 1926 – January 23, 2001), known professionally as "Brother" Jack McDuff or "Captain" Jack McDuff, was an American jazz organist and organ trio bandleader who was most prominent during the hard bop and soul jazz era of the 1960s, often performing with an organ trio. He is also credited with giving guitarist George Benson his first break.

Career
Born Eugene McDuffy in Champaign, Illinois, McDuff began playing bass, appearing in Joe Farrell's group. Encouraged by Willis Jackson in whose band he also played bass in the late 1950s, McDuff moved to the organ and began to attract the attention of Prestige while still with Jackson's group. McDuff soon became a bandleader, leading groups featuring a young George Benson on guitar, Red Holloway on tenor saxophone and Joe Dukes on drums.

McDuff recorded many classic albums on Prestige, including his debut solo Brother Jack in 1960; The Honeydripper (1961), with tenor saxophonist Jimmy Forrest and guitarist Grant Green; Brother Jack Meets The Boss (1962), featuring Gene Ammons; Screamin’ (1962), with alto saxophonist Leo Wright and guitarist Kenny Burrell; and Brother Jack McDuff Live! (1963), featuring Holloway and Benson, which includes his biggest hit, "Rock Candy".

After his tenure at Prestige, McDuff joined the Atlantic label for a brief period, and in the 1970s he recorded for Blue Note. To Seek a New Home (1970) was recorded in England with a line-up featuring blues shouter Jimmy Witherspoon and some of Britain's top jazz musicians of the day, including Terry Smith on guitar and Dick Morrissey on tenor saxophone.

Decreasing interest in jazz and blues during the late 1970s and 1980s meant that many jazz musicians went through a lean time. But in 1988, with The Re-Entry, recorded for the Muse label, McDuff once again began a successful period of recordings, initially for Muse, then on the Concord Jazz label in 1991. George Benson appeared on his 1992 Color Me Blue album.

Despite health problems, McDuff continued working and recording throughout the 1980s and 1990s, and he toured Japan with Atsuko Hashimoto in 2000. "Capt'n" Jack McDuff, as he later became known, died of heart failure at the age of 74 in Minneapolis, Minnesota. His first wife, the former Dink Dixon, died in the early 1980s. McDuff leaves his second wife Kathy and her two children.

Discography

As leader

Prestige Records
 Brother Jack (Prestige, 1960) -with Bill Jennings  [note: reissued on Groove Hut (#66714) in 2011]
 Tough 'Duff (Prestige, 1960) -with Jimmy Forrest, Lem Winchester  [note: reissued on Groove Hut (#66714) in 2011]
 The Honeydripper (Prestige, 1961) -with Jimmy Forrest, Grant Green [note: reissued on Groove Hut (#66717) in 2013]
 Goodnight, It's Time to Go (Prestige, 1961) -with Harold Vick, Grant Green [note: reissued on Groove Hut (#66717) in 2013]
 On With It! (Prestige, 1961 [rel. 1971]) -with Harold Vick
 Brother Jack Meets the Boss [also released as Mellow Gravy] (Prestige, 1962) -with Gene Ammons [note: reissued on Groove Hut (#66721) in 2015]
 Stitt Meets Brother Jack  [also released as  'Nuther Fu'ther] (Prestige, 1962) -with Sonny Stitt [note: reissued on Groove Hut (#66718) in 2013]
 Screamin' (Prestige, 1962) -with Leo Wright, Kenny Burrell
 Somethin' Slick! (Prestige, 1963) -with Kenny Burrell
 Crash! (Prestige 1963) -with Kenny Burrell
 Brother Jack McDuff Live! (Prestige, 1963) -with Red Holloway, George Benson
 Brother Jack at the Jazz Workshop Live! (Prestige, 1963) -with Red Holloway, Harold Vick, George Benson
 Prelude (Prestige, 1963) -with Benny Golson's big soul band
 Cookin' Together (Prestige, 1964) -with Red Holloway, George Benson, Joe Dukes
 The Dynamic Jack McDuff (Prestige, 1964) -with Benny Golson's big soul band
 The Concert McDuff (Prestige, 1964) -with Red Holloway, George Benson
 Silk and Soul (Prestige, 1965) -with Red Holloway, George Benson
 Hot Barbeque (Prestige, 1965) -with Red Holloway, George Benson
 Walk On By (Prestige, 1966) -with Red Holloway, Harold Ousley, Pat Martino
 Hallelujah Time! (Prestige, rec. 1963/1964/1966 [rel. 1967])
 The Midnight Sun (Prestige, rec. 1963/1964/1965/1966 [rel. 1968])
 Soul Circle (Prestige, rec. 1964/1965/1966 [rel. 1968])
 I Got a Woman (Prestige, rec. 1964/1965/1966 [rel. 1969])
 Steppin' Out (Prestige, rec. 1961/1963/1964/1965/1966 [rel. 1969])

Atlantic Records
 A Change Is Gonna Come (Atlantic, 1966) [note: reissued on Collectables in 1999]
 Tobacco Road (Atlantic, 1966) [note: reissued on Collectables in 2000]
 Do It Now! (Atlantic, 1967) [note: reissued on Collectables in 2000]
 Double Barrelled Soul (Atlantic, 1967) -with David "Fathead" Newman [note: reissued on Collectables in 1999]

Cadet/GRT Records
 The Natural Thing (Cadet/GRT, 1968)
 Getting Our Thing Together (Cadet/GRT, 1968) -with Richard Evans
 Gin and Orange (Cadet/GRT, 1969) [note: reissued on Dusty Groove in 2007]
 The Heatin' System (Cadet/GRT, 1971)
 Check This Out [live] (Cadet/GRT, 1972)
 The Fourth Dimension (Cadet/GRT, 1974)
 Magnetic Feel (Cadet/GRT, 1975)
 Sophisticated Funk (Chess/All Platinum ACH-19004, 1976)

Blue Note Records
 Down Home Style (Blue Note, 1969)
 Moon Rappin' (Blue Note, 1969)
 To Seek a New Home (Blue Note 1970)
 Who Knows What Tomorrow's Gonna Bring? (Blue Note, 1970) [note: reissued on Water Records in 2005]

Other labels
 Kisses (Sugar Hill SH-247, 1981)
 Having A Good Time (Sugar Hill SH-264, 1982)
 Live It Up (Sugar Hill/Chess/MCA SH-9202, 1984)
 Lift Every Voice And Sing (JAM [Jazz America Marketing] 016, 1984)
 The Re-Entry (Muse MR-5361, 1988) -with Cecil Bridgewater, Houston Person [note: reissued on 32 Jazz in 1997; reissued again on Savoy Jazz in 2003]
 Another Real Good 'Un (Muse MR-5374, 1990) -with Cecil Bridgewater, Houston Person [note: reissued on 32 Jazz in 1999; reissued again on Savoy Jazz in 2003]
 Jack-Pot (Red [Italy] 123267, 1991 [rel. 1997])
 Live At Parnell's (Soul Bank Music, 2022 [rec. 1982])

Concord Jazz Records
 Color Me Blue (Concord Jazz, 1992) -with George Benson
 Write On, Capt'n (Concord Jazz, 1993)
 The Heatin' System (Concord Jazz, 1994)
 It's About Time (Concord Jazz, 1995) -with Joey DeFrancesco
 That's The Way I Feel About It (Concord Jazz, 1996) -with Chris Potter
 (Down Home) Blues (Concord Jazz, 1997) -with Gene Harris
 Bringin' It Home (Concord Jazz, 1998) -with Red Holloway, George Benson 
 Brotherly Love (Concord Jazz, 2001) -with Red Holloway, Pat Martino

LP/CD compilations
 Brother Jack McDuff's Greatest Hits (Prestige 7481, 1967)
 Brother Jack McDuff Plays For Beautiful People (Prestige 7596, 1968)
 The Best Of Brother Jack McDuff Live! (Prestige 7703, 1969)
 The Best Of Brother Jack McDuff & The Big Soul Band (Prestige 7771, 1970) -with Benny Golson
 Rock Candy (Prestige 24013, 1972) [2LP]
 George Benson/Jack McDuff (Prestige 24072, 1977 [2LP]; CD finally released in 2007) (compilation of The New Boss Guitar Of George Benson + Hot Barbeque)
 Crash! Jack McDuff Featuring Kenny Burrell (Prestige, 1994) (compilation of Somethin' Slick! + Crash!)
 Brother Red: Red Holloway With Jack McDuff, George Benson, Joe Dukes (Prestige, 1994) (compilation of Cookin' Together + 3 tracks from The Dynamic Jack McDuff, and "Redwood City"...originally released on the various artists compilation The Soul Jazz Giants [Prestige 7791] in 1971)
 Live! (Prestige, 1994) (compilation of Brother Jack McDuff Live! + Brother Jack At The Jazz Workshop Live!)
 Legends Of Acid Jazz: Jack McDuff (Prestige, 1997) (compilation drawn from six different McDuff albums; all material recorded July 1964)
 Legends Of Acid Jazz: Jack McDuff – Brother Jack (Prestige, 1999) (compilation of Brother Jack + Goodnight, It's Time To Go)
 Silken Soul (Prestige, 2000) (compilation drawn from seven different McDuff albums)
 The Soulful Drums (Prestige, 2001) (compilation of The Soulful Drums Of Joe Dukes + Hot Barbeque)
 The Concert McDuff (Prestige, 2002) (compilation of The Concert McDuff + one track from Hallelujah Time!, two tracks from The Midnight Sun, and one track from I Got A Woman)
 The Last Goodun (Prestige, 2002) (compilation drawn from seven different McDuff albums; material on first seven tracks [the On With It! session] recorded December 1961)
 Funk Pie (Recall [UK], 2002) [2CD] (compilation of Concord material)
 The Best Of The Concord Years (Concord Jazz, 2003)
 Prelude: Jack McDuff Big Band (Prestige, 2003) (compilation of Prelude + 11 bonus tracks featuring McDuff's "large" groups, drawn from five different albums)
 Willis Jackson With Jack McDuff – Together Again! (Prestige, 2003) (compilation of Together Again! + Together Again, Again)
 The Prestige Years (Prestige, 2004) (compilation drawn from ten different McDuff albums)
 Jack McDuff: Eight Classic Albums (Real Gone Jazz [EU], 2013) [4CD] (compilation of Brother Jack; Tough 'Duff; The Honeydripper; Goodnight, It's Time To Go; Kirk's Work; Brother Jack Meets The Boss; Screamin'''; Stitt Meets Brother Jack)
 Brother Jack McDuff: The Classic Albums 1960–1963 (Enlightenment [EU], 2020) [4CD] (compilation of The Honeydripper; Goodnight, It's Time To Go; Screamin; Somethin' Slick!; Crash!; Brother Jack McDuff Live!; Brother Jack At The Jazz Workshop Live!; Prelude)

As sideman
With Gene Ammons
 Twisting the Jug (Prestige, 1961) -with Joe Newman [note: reissued on Groove Hut (#66721) in 2015]
 Soul Summit (Prestige, 1962) -with Sonny Stitt [note: reissued on Groove Hut (#66721) in 2015]
 Soul Summit Vol. 2 (Prestige, 1961-1962 [rel. 1963]) -with Etta Jones
With George Benson
 The New Boss Guitar of George Benson (Prestige, 1964) -with Red Holloway, Joe Dukes
With Joshua Breakstone
 Remembering Grant Green (Evidence, 1993 [rel. 1996])
With Kenny Burrell
 Bluesin' Around (Columbia, 1962 [rel. 1983])
With Hank Crawford
 Double Cross (Atlantic, 1968)
With King Curtis
 Old Gold (Tru-Sound, 1961)
With Lou Donaldson
 A Man With a Horn (Blue Note, 1961 [rel. 1999])
With Joe Dukes
 The Soulful Drums of Joe Dukes (Prestige, 1964) -with Red Holloway, George Benson
With Grant Green
 Grantstand (Blue Note, 1961) -with Yusef Lateef
With Al Grey
 Me 'N' Jack (Pullen Music, 1996) -with Jerry Weldon
With Roy Hargrove
 The Vibe (Novus, 1992)
With Gene Harris
 Alley Cats [live] (Concord, 1998 [rel. 1999])
With Willis Jackson
 "Good To The Bone" b/w "Making It" (Fire, 1959) -with Bill Jennings
 Please Mr. Jackson [also released as Cool Grits] (Prestige, 1959) -with Bill Jennings
 Cool "Gator" [also released as Keep On A Blowin' ] (Prestige, 1960) -with Bill Jennings
 Blue Gator (Prestige, 1960) -with Bill Jennings
 Cookin' Sherry (Prestige, rec. 1959/1960 [rel. 1961]) -with Bill Jennings
 Together Again! (Prestige, rec. 1959/1960 [rel. 1965]) -with Bill Jennings
 Together Again, Again (Prestige, rec. 1959/1960/1961 [rel. 1966]) -with Bill Jennings
 The Best of Willis Jackson With Brother Jack McDuff (Prestige 7702, 1969)
With Etta James and Eddie "Cleanhead" Vinson
 Blues in the Night Volume One: The Early Show (Fantasy, 1986) -with Red Holloway, Shuggie Otis
 The Late Show: Blues in the Night Volume 2 (Fantasy, 1987) -with Red Holloway, Shuggie Otis
With Bill Jennings
 Enough Said! (Prestige, 1959)
 Glide On (Prestige, 1960)
With Roland Kirk
 Kirk's Work (Prestige, 1961)
With Carmen McRae
 Fine and Mellow: Live at Birdland West (Concord, 1987) -with Red Holloway, Phil Upchurch
With Mike Pachelli
 Meeting Point (Fullblast, 1999)
With Houston PersonThe Real Thing [live] (Eastbound, 1973) 2LP
With Betty Roché
 Singin' & Swingin' (Prestige, 1960) -with Jimmy Forrest, Bill Jennings 
With Shakey JakeGood Times (Bluesville, 1960)
With Dave Specter
 Left Turn On Blue (Delmark, 1995) -with Lynwood Slim
With Sonny Stitt
 Soul Shack (Prestige, 1963) [note: reissued on Groove Hut (#66718) in 2013]
 The Best of Sonny Stitt With Brother Jack McDuff (Prestige 7701, 1969)
 The Best of Sonny Stitt With Brother Jack McDuff/For Lovers (Prestige 7769, 1970)
With Winston Walls
 Boss of the B3 (Schoolkids, 1993)
With Joe Williams
 Nothin' but the Blues (Delos, 1983) -with Red Holloway, Eddie "Cleanhead" Vinson, Phil Upchurch
With Jimmy Witherspoon
 The Blues Is Now (Verve, 1967) -with Melvin Sparks
With Kankawa
 Organ Meeting (What'sNew Records, 2001) [Rec. Live in Tokyo, 2000]

References

External links

Jack McDuff discography at Jazzlists
 Obituary at The Guardian''
Extended biography of Jack McDuff

 

Soul-jazz organists
Hard bop organists
Jazz-funk organists
American jazz organists
American male organists
1926 births
2001 deaths
Cadet Records artists
Prestige Records artists
Transatlantic Records artists
Atlantic Records artists
MCA Records artists
Blue Note Records artists
Muse Records artists
Red Records artists
20th-century American keyboardists
Musicians from Champaign, Illinois
20th-century organists
Jazz musicians from Illinois
20th-century American male musicians
American male jazz musicians